"Heart of Love", also known by the title "Climbing to the Heart of Love", is a song written by Roxanne Seeman and Billie Hughes. It was recorded by Joni Paladin, under the pseudonym Jamie Bond, and produced by George Duke for the soundtrack to the film The Heavenly Kid. It appears in a montage scene with Bobby (Lewis Smith) and Emily (Jane Kaczmarek). The song was released as the first single in 1985 by Elektra Records.

Six years later, in 1991, as reported by Shelly Weiss in Cashbox, "Heart Of Love" MJQ Majic 102.5, Buffalo, Program Director Hank Nevins caught the movie on HBO and put the song on the air. The sensational reaction of listeners from Buffalo, Rochester, and Toronto moved "Heart Of Love" into power rotation. MJQ received overwhelming requests from record stores in Canada and the US wishing to buy the disc.

Production 

 George Duke - Producer, Executive-Producer
 Erik Zobler - Recording Engineer 
 Errol Sober - Music Supervisor

 Recording Studio – Le Gonks West
 Mixed At – Lion Share Recording Studios
 Mastered At – Bernie Grundman Mastering
 Mastered By – Brian Gardner

Pressed By – Allied Record Company

Other versions 
 Billie Hughes
Melissa Manchester, If My Heart Had Wings, 1995, produced by Ron Nevison, Arif Mardin, executive producer

Critical reception 
Billboard gave a "Recommended Pick" which said: "Ballad from the "Heavenly Kid" soundtrack; fans of Whitney Houston should take note of a comparable talent."

William Ruhlmann, writing for AllMusic, described the songs on "If My Heart Had Wings":  "Melissa Manchester's first album of new material in a decade was filled with big, dramatic ballads and widescreen production values."

References

External links

 

1985 songs
1985 singles
Songs written by Billie Hughes
Songs written by Roxanne Seeman
Song recordings produced by Ron Nevison
Song recordings produced by Arif Mardin
Song recordings produced by George Duke
Elektra Records singles
Songs written for films